The Buchstab function (or Buchstab's function) is the unique continuous function  defined by the delay differential equation

In the second equation, the derivative at u = 2 should be taken as u approaches 2 from the right. It is named after Alexander Buchstab, who wrote about it in 1937.

Asymptotics
The Buchstab function approaches  rapidly as  where  is the Euler–Mascheroni constant.  In fact,

where ρ  is the Dickman function.  Also,  oscillates in a regular way, alternating between extrema and zeroes; the extrema alternate between positive maxima and negative minima.  The interval between consecutive extrema approaches 1 as u approaches infinity, as does the interval between consecutive zeroes.

Applications
The Buchstab function is used to count rough numbers.
If Φ(x, y) is the number of positive integers less than or equal to x with no prime factor less than y, then for any fixed u > 1,

Notes

References
 
 "Buchstab Function", Wolfram MathWorld.  Accessed on line Feb. 11, 2015.
 §IV.32, "On Φ(x,y) and Buchstab's function", Handbook of Number Theory I, József Sándor, Dragoslav S. Mitrinović, and Borislav Crstici, Springer, 2006, .
 "A differential delay equation arising from the sieve of Eratosthenes", A. Y. Cheer and D. A. Goldston, Mathematics of Computation 55 (1990), pp. 129–141.
 "An improvement of Selberg’s sieve method", W. B. Jurkat and H.-E. Richert, Acta Arithmetica 11 (1965), pp. 217–240.
 

Analytic number theory
Special functions